Guaymuras may refer to 
Guaimura
The agreement reached to end the 2009 Honduran constitutional crisis